A number of sailing ships have been named Herald, for the Herald:

 was launched at Newburyport, Massachusetts in 1797. The US Navy purchased her from Edward Davis in 1798 and sold her in 1801. She became the French 20-gun privateer corvette Africaine. In 1804 a British privateer seized her on 4 May 1804 at Charleston, South Carolina. The seizure gave rise to a case in the U.S. courts that defined the limits of U.S. territorial waters. The U.S. courts ruled that the privateer had seized Africaine outside U.S. jurisdiction. Africaine then became a Liverpool-based slave ship that made two voyages carrying slaves from West Africa to the West Indies. After the abolition of the slave trade in 1807 she became a West Indiaman that two French privateers captured in late 1807 or early 1808.
 acquired a letter of marque on 15 January 1798. On 24 February as she was entering the Bay of Naples, three French privateers attacked her; in a three-hour action she repelled the attack. In August she captured a Spanish ship, but in December 1798 or January 1799 five Spanish frigates captured Herald.
Herald was a ship launched in 1799 at Whitby that the British Royal Navy purchased in 1803 and renamed . The Navy sold her in 1816 and she returned to mercantile service under her original name. She was lost in 1835.
, was a 55-ton (bm) schooner, the first vessel built in New Zealand. Missionaries launched her in 1826, and she was wrecked in 1828.

See also

Citations

Herald